The Ontario Securities Commission (OSC) is a regulatory agency which administers and enforces securities legislation in the Canadian province of Ontario. The OSC is an Ontario Crown agency which reports to the Ontario legislature through the Minister of Finance.

Canada does not have a national securities regulator, and each province and territory regulates its own capital markets; OSC regulates the capital markets in Ontario. Other notable provincial regulators include the Alberta Securities Commission, the Autorité des marchés financiers (Québec), and the British Columbia Securities Commission.

OSC Mandate:
 Protect investors from unfair, improper and fraudulent practices
 Foster fair and efficient capital markets
 Maintain public and investor confidence in the integrity of those markets

The OSC administers the Ontario Securities Act and the Commodity Futures Act and with about 500 employees, is the largest securities regulator in Canada and has the Toronto Stock Exchange within its jurisdiction.

See also
 Alberta Securities Commission 
 Autorité des marchés financiers (Québec)
 British Columbia Securities Commission
 Canadian securities regulation
 Canadian Securities Administrators
 Glorianne Stromberg, former commissioner

References

External links
 Ontario Securities Commission website
 Securities Act
 Commodity Futures Act
 SEDAR- Provides access to public fillings of Canadian Securities Issuers

Crown corporations of Ontario
Financial regulatory authorities of Canada
Ontario government departments and agencies
Ontario government tribunals
Securities and exchange commissions
Government agencies established in 1932
1932 establishments in Ontario